Sebastian Barry (born 5 July 1955) is an Irish novelist, playwright and poet. He was named Laureate for Irish Fiction, 2019–2021. He is noted for his lyrical literary writing style and is considered one of Ireland's finest writers.

Barry's literary career began in poetry before he began writing plays and novels.

He has been twice shortlisted for the Man Booker Prize for his novels A Long Long Way (2005) and The Secret Scripture (2008), the latter of which won the 2008 Costa Book of the Year and the James Tait Black Memorial Prize. His 2011 novel, On Canaan's Side, was longlisted for the Booker. In January 2017, Barry was awarded the Costa Book of the Year prize for Days Without End, becoming the first novelist to win the prestigious prize twice.

Early life
Barry was born in Dublin. His mother was acclaimed actress Joan O'Hara. He was educated at Catholic University School and Trinity College, Dublin, where he read English and Latin.

Work
His academic posts have included Honorary Fellow in Writing at the University of Iowa (1984), Heimbold Visiting Professor at Villanova University (2006) and Writer Fellow at Trinity College, Dublin (1995–1996). Barry started his literary career with the novel Macker's Garden in 1982. His first play, The Pentagonal Dream, starred Olwen Fouéré and debuted in the Damer Theatre in March 1986. This was followed by several books of poetry and a further novel, The Engine of Owl-Light in 1987, before his career as a playwright began with his first play produced in the Abbey Theatre, Boss Grady's Boys in 1988.

Barry's maternal great-grandfather, James Dunne, provided the inspiration for the main character in his most internationally known play, The Steward of Christendom, which won the Christopher Ewart-Biggs Memorial Prize, the Lloyd's Private Banking Playwright of the Year Award and other awards. The main character, named Thomas Dunne in the play, was the chief superintendent of the Dublin Metropolitan Police from 1913 to 1922. He oversaw the area surrounding Dublin Castle until the Irish Free State takeover on 16 January 1922. 
One of Barry's grandfathers belonged to the British Army Corps of Royal Engineers. His other grandfather was a painter and a Nationalist, and a devotee of De Valera.

Both The Steward of Christendom and the novel The Whereabouts of Eneas McNulty, are about the dislocations (physical and otherwise) of loyalist Irish people during the political upheavals of the early 20th century. The title character of the latter work is a young man forced to leave Ireland by his former friends in the aftermath of the Anglo-Irish War.

His novel A Long Long Way was shortlisted for the 2005 Man Booker Prize, and was selected for Dublin's 2007 One City One Book event. The novel tells the story of Willie Dunne, a young recruit to the Royal Dublin Fusiliers during the First World War. It brings to life the divided loyalty that many Irish soldiers felt at the time following the Easter Rising in 1916. Willie Dunne, son of the fictional Thomas Dunne, first appears as a minor but important character in The Steward of Christendom.

Barry's 2008 novel, The Secret Scripture won the James Tait Black Memorial Prize for fiction (announced in August 2009), the oldest such award in the UK, the 2008 Costa Book of the Year (announced 27 January 2009) and in French translation Le testament caché it won the 2010 Cezam Prix Littéraire Inter CE. It was also a favourite to win the 2008 Man Booker Prize, narrowly losing out to Aravind Adiga's The White Tiger.

Barry's play Andersen's English, is inspired by children's writer Hans Christian Andersen coming to stay with Charles Dickens and his family in the Kent marshes. Directed by Max Stafford-Clark and produced by Out of Joint and Hampstead Theatre, the play toured in the UK from 11 February to 8 May 2010.

Our Lady of Sligo was directed in 1998 by Maxwell "Max" Stafford-Clark at the Royal National Theatre co−produced by Out of Joint.

On Canaan's Side, Barry's fifth novel, concerns Lily Bere, the sister of the character Willy Dunne from A Long Long Way and the daughter of the character Thomas Dunne from The Steward of Christendom, as she emigrates to the US. The novel was longlisted for the 2011 Man Booker Prize and won the 2012 Walter Scott Prize. Barry's next novel, The Temporary Gentleman, tells the story of Jack McNulty—an Irishman whose commission in the British army in WWII was never permanent. Sitting in his lodgings in Accra, Ghana, in 1957, he is writing the story of his life with desperate urgency. Barry's novel Days Without End followed in 2016, winning The Costa Book Of The Year 2017, The Walter Scott Prize, and The Independent Booksellers' Prize, and being longlisted for the Man Booker Prize 2017.

Personal life
Barry lives in County Wicklow with his wife, actor and screenwriter Alison Deegan.

In 2001, Barry established his personal and professional archive at the Harry Ransom Center. More than sixty boxes of papers document his diverse writing career and range of creative output which includes drawings, poetry, short stories, novels, essays, and scripts.

Barry has been awarded honorary degrees from NUI Galway (2012), the Open University and the University of East Anglia. He has an Alumni Award from Trinity College, Dublin. In 2022 he was made an honorary fellow of Trinity College.

List of works
Poetry
The Water Colourist (Dolmen Press, 1983)
The Rhetorical Town (Dolmen Press, 1985)
Fanny Hawke Goes to the Mainland Forever (Raven Arts Press, 1989)

Fiction
Mackers Garden (1982)
The Engine of Owl-Light (1987)
The Whereabouts of Eneas McNulty (1998)
Annie Dunne (2002)
A Long Long Way (2005)
The Secret Scripture (2008)
On Canaan's Side (2011)
The Temporary Gentleman (2014)
Days Without End (2016)
A Thousand Moons (2020)
Old God's Time (2023)

Plays
The Pentagonal Dream (1986)
Boss Grady's Boys (1988)
Prayers of Sherkin (1990)
White Woman Street (1992)
The Only True HIstory of Lizzie Finn (1995)
The Steward of Christendom (1995)
Our Lady of Sligo (1998)
Hinterland (2002)
Whistling Psyche (2004)
Fred and Jane (2004)
The Pride of Parnell Street (2008)
Dallas Sweetman (2008)
Tales of Ballycumber (2009)
Andersen's English (2010)
On Blueberry Hill (2017)

References

External links
 Sebastian Barry Papers at the Harry Ransom Center
 Biography at the British Council
 Short biography from the Berlin International Literature Festival

1955 births
Living people
Academics of Trinity College Dublin
Alumni of Trinity College Dublin
Aosdána members
Christopher Ewart-Biggs Memorial Prize recipients
Fellows of the Royal Society of Literature
Honorary Fellows of Trinity College Dublin
Irish dramatists and playwrights
Irish male dramatists and playwrights
Irish poets
James Tait Black Memorial Prize recipients
20th-century Irish novelists
20th-century Irish male writers
Irish male novelists
21st-century Irish novelists
Irish male poets
International Writing Program alumni
21st-century Irish male writers
People educated at Catholic University School
Walter Scott Prize winners